Shihab Ghanem (born 1940) is an Emirati engineer, administrator, poet and author.

Ghanem was the first Arab to win The Tagore Peace Award in 2012 from the Asian Society in Calcutta, India, the Poetry Award for Culture & Humanism in 2013 from the World Poetry Society Intercontinental, Chennai, India; the Cultural Personality of the Year in 2013 from Al-Owais Creativity Award, Dubai, UAE; and an honorary Doctorate in 2015 from Soka University in Japan

Ghanem's poems have been translated into 12 languages.

Biography 
Shihab Muhammad Abduh Ghanem Al-Hashmi was born in Aden in 1940 and completed his secondary education at Aden College. He then obtained a double degree in Mechanical and Electrical engineering from Aberdeen University in Scotland in 1964. Ghanem obtained a master's degree in Water Resources Development from Roorkee University in India in 1975 and a Doctorate in industrial development from the economics department of Cardiff University in Wales in 1989. He became a Fellow of the Institution of Mechanical Engineers of UK in 1990, and a Fellow of the Institute of Management of UK in 1990.

Engineering career 
Ghanem worked as Deputy Permanent Secretary of Public Works and Communications in Aden, Chief engineer of Eterno Supplies in Lebanon, Plant Manager of Gulf Eternit in Dubai. Between 1988 and 2003 he worked as Director of Engineering of Dubai Ports and Jebel Free Zone, and managing director of Mohammed Bin Rashid Technology Park.

Literary career 
Ghanem was editor of Aden College magazine (1957–60), committee member of Al-Muntada, the UAE first literary magazine (1983–87), member of the advisory committee of Shuoon Adabiyah UAE writers magazine (2003–2005), member of advisory committee of Kalima translation project (2011–2015), advisor of Aden College website since it was established in 2009, advisor of Al-Mishkat literary magazine since 2012, and co-founder and advisor of the international poetry festival Poetic Heart since 2011.

Ghanem has published 62 books, including 24 volumes of translations of verse from Arabic to English or English to Arabic. His 16 poetry books include: Arabic: Complete Poetry works (2009), One Hundred and One Poems (2011), Al-Amwaj (2015). English: Shades of Love (1995), In the Valley of the Muses (2011).

Ghanem's 22 prose works include: Industrialization in the United Arab Emirates (in English, Avebury, U.K.,  2002), Bayn Madinatain (Biography of his father in Arabic) (2008), 1500 English Proverbs with Arabic Equivalents (Express Printing, 2015), Al-Fatihah (in English co-authored with his son Dr Waddah Ghanem, Patridge, Singapore 2016)

Personal life 
Ghanem's paternal grandfather Abduh Ghanem (1889–56) was a legislative council member and president of the Arab Reform Club in Tawahi, Aden. His maternal grandfather advocate and novelist Mohammed Ali Lokman (1898–1966) was a renaissance figure in Aden and established the first Arabic and first English independent newspapers there. His father is Arab poet Muhammad Abduh Ghanem (1912–1994). He published 20 books.

Ghanem lives in Dubai, UAE and has three children.

References 

 Al-Babateen Dictionary of Contemporary Arab Poets,(in Arabic), vol 2, 1995
 U. A. E. Poets Encyclopedia (in Arabic), Bilal Al-Budoor, 2015
 Shihab Ghanem the first Arab to receive India’s Tagore Peace Prize
 UAE POET SHIHAB GHANEM WINS POETRY AWARD FOR CULTURE AND HUMANISM
 UAE Poet Dr. Ghanem Visits Soka University
 Lack of translations has let down Arabic
 Shihab Ghanem became the First Arab to receive India’s Tagore Peace Prize 
 Shihab Ghanem the first Arab to receive India’s Tagore Peace Prize
 Poet Shihab Ghanem awarded 'Tagore Peace Award'
 Shihab Ghanem receives Tagore Peace Award
 SHIHAB GHANEM RECEIVES TAGORE PEACE PRIZE IN CALCUTTA
 A humanist fostering harmony, world peace
 Dr Shihab M.A. Ghanem – UAE poet and translator of renown
 ADACH publishes English-translated Arabic poetry collection
 Dr. Shihab Ghanem to be honoured during annual Sivagiri pilgrimage
 Collection for Ghanem
 Dr. Shihab Ghanem gave a lecture on "Al Fatihah―The Opening Chapter of the Quran"
 ഡോ. ശിഹാബ് ഗാനിം: മലയാള കവിതകള്‍ നെഞ്ചോട് ചേര്‍ത്ത അറബി കവി
 अभियांत्रिकी आणि अर्थशास्त्र यांच्या ज्ञानाचा वापर करून ते नियोजनतज्ज्ञ झाले, पण त्यांचा पिंड भाषाप्रेमाचा
 UAE poet Shihab Ghanem wins Poetry Award for Culture and Humanism
 Poeti dal mondo, Shihab M. Ghanem, Emirati Arabi Uniti
 Liste des livres de l'auteur DR SHIHAB GHANEM
 Dr. Shihab Ghanem
 Dr. Shihab Ghanem
 Dr. Shihab Ghanem
 Dr. Shihab Ghanem

External links
 Personal Website

20th-century Emirati poets
Living people
1940 births
People from Aden
Emirati mechanical engineers
Alumni of the University of Aberdeen
Alumni of Cardiff University
Fellows of the Institution of Mechanical Engineers
People from Dubai
21st-century Emirati poets